is a 1974 Japanese Toei's "pinky violence" style of pink film. Directed by Yukio Noda. Based on Tōru Shinohara's manga "Zeroka no Onna".

Plot
Division 0 is a secret department that does not belong to any of the Investigation Divisions at the Police Department. Rei was a detective of Division 0, but she was sent to jail for killing a person who killed her close friend. Kyoko, daughter of the next prime minister's candidate, Zengo Nagumo, has been kidnapped. Rei is released on condition that she helps Kyoko safely.

Cast
 Miki Sugimoto as Rei (Zero Woman)
 Tetsuro Tamba as Nagumo Zengo
 Hideo Murota as Hidaka Masashi
 Eiji Go as Nakahara Yoshihide
 Ichirō Araki as Seki Saburo
 Rokkō Toura as Tani
 Akira Kume as Inoue
 Yōko Mihara as Yano Kazuko
 Ralph Jesser as Richard Saxon

References

External links
 

Japanese crime films
1970s Japanese-language films
Toei Pinky Violence
Toei Company films
1970s Japanese films